Ephippus is a genus of spadefishes.

Species
There are currently two recognized species in this genus:
 Ephippus goreensis G. Cuvier, 1831 (East Atlantic African spadefish)
 Ephippus orbis (Bloch, 1787) (Orbfish)

References

Ephippidae
Marine fish families
Taxa named by Georges Cuvier